Micromyzus judenkoi, is an aphid in the superfamily Aphidoidea in the order Hemiptera. It is a true bug and sucks sap from plants.

References 

 http://aphid.speciesfile.org/Common/basic/Taxa.aspx?TaxonNameID=1169175
 https://www.gbif.org/species/2070229
 http://iphylo.org/~rpage/afd/id/0675e0a7-9fe5-4afa-8b18-caa00f4206f0
 http://thakshana.nsf.ac.lk/slstic/NA-215/NA_215.pdf

Agricultural pest insects
Macrosiphini